John Adam Ryder (February 29, 1852 in Franklin County, Pennsylvania – March 26, 1895), was an American zoologist and embryologist. He worked for the United States Fish Commission from 1880 to 1886 and Professor of Comparative Embryology at the University of Pennsylvania from 1886 to 1895.

He was elected as a member to the American Philosophical Society in 1886.

See also
:Category:Taxa named by John A. Ryder

References

External links

American ichthyologists
American embryologists
1852 births
1895 deaths
University of Pennsylvania faculty
University of Pennsylvania Department of Biology faculty
People from Franklin County, Pennsylvania
19th-century American zoologists

Members of the American Philosophical Society